State Route 86 is a state highway in the U.S. state of Utah.

Route description
The highway starts at the northeast side access ramps of I-84 at exit 112. From there, it crosses southwest under the interstate and takes an immediate turn southeast. It continues in this direction as main street in Henefer for approximately 2 miles until it terminates at the intersection with SR-65 (East Canyon Road) in the central part of town.

History
From 1935 to 1969, State Route 86 was a different highway, connecting towns in Duchesne County. That highway designation was deleted in 1969.

Prior to 1975, the road currently designated as SR-86 was actually a spur of SR-65; the main route of SR-65 turned southeast to the east Henefer interchange. This spur was redesignated as a distinct state route in 1975.

Major intersections

References

 086
086